Acraea equatorialis is a butterfly in the family Nymphalidae. It is found in Uganda, Kenya and Tanzania.

Description

A. aequatorialis [sic] Neave (60 g) has the forewing thinly scaled and only bordered by a fine black line at the apex and distal margin; marginal band of the hindwing above in the male very narrowly light-spotted or incomplete, in the female more sharply defined and more indistinctly spotted; the base of the hind wing above narrowly tinged with blackish; the black dots are arranged as in the other species; wings above light (reddish) yellow; the forewing at the distal margin with finely black veins and fine streaks on the folds, occasionally with submarginal dot in 2 or in lb. British East Africa: Kisumu. - anaemia Eltr. only differs in the lighter and more thinly scaled wings. Kilimandjaro and British East Africa.

Subspecies
Acraea equatorialis equatorialis (eastern Uganda, western Kenya, north-western Tanzania) 
Acraea equatorialis anaemia Eltringham, 1912 (eastern Kenya, north-eastern Tanzania)

Biology
The larvae feed on Passiflora species and Malva verticillata.

Taxonomy
It is a member of the Acraea caecilia species group. See also Pierre & Bernaud, 2014.

References

External links

Images representing Acraea equatorialis at Bold

Butterflies described in 1904
equatorialis